Ochromima megalopoides is a species of beetle in the family Cerambycidae. It was described by Henry Walter Bates in 1866. It is known from Brazil, Guyana, Suriname and French Guiana.

References

Hemilophini
Beetles described in 1866